The Mt. Baldy League is a high school athletic league that is part of the CIF Southern Section. Members are located in southwestern San Bernardino County, California.

Members
 Diamond Bar High School -- Diamond Bar, California
 Chaffey High School -- Ontario
 Chino High School -- Chino
 Don Lugo High School -- Chino
 Montclair High School -- Montclair
 Ontario High School -- Ontario

References

CIF Southern Section leagues